Susan Marqusee is the Eveland Warren Endowed Chair Professor of Biochemistry, Biophysics, and Structural Biology at the University of California, Berkeley, and the Berkeley campus director of the California Institute for Quantitative Biosciences. Her research concerns the structure and dynamics of protein molecules. She received her A.B. in Physics and Chemistry from Cornell University in 1982, and her Ph.D. (Biochemistry) and M.D. degrees from Stanford University in 1990, where she trained with Robert Baldwin on the intrinsic helical properties of amino acids in model peptides.

She was one of the 1995 winners of the Beckman Young Investigators Award, the 1996–1997 winner of the Margaret Oakley Dayhoff Award, and the 2012 winner of the William C. Rose Award.
In 2016 she was elected to the National Academy of Sciences. Her recent research concerns protein energetics, folding and turnover as altered by protein ubiquitylation.

References

External links
Marqusee lab

Year of birth missing (living people)
Living people
American women biochemists
Cornell University alumni
Stanford University alumni
University of California, Berkeley College of Letters and Science faculty
Members of the United States National Academy of Sciences
21st-century American women